This article lists Italian regions and autonomous provinces (NUTS 2) by gross domestic product (GDP).

Gross domestic product by region
This table reports the nominal GDP of the twenty regions of Italy from 2000 to 2019, expressed in billions of euro.

Per capita GDP by region
Figures are in euros at market exchange rates and not at purchasing power parity (PPP).

Provincial GDP 
All provinces and metropolitan cities of Italy by GDP and GDP per capita in 2015.

References

GDP
Regions by GDP
I
GDP
Italy, GDP